The R626 is a regional road in County Cork, Ireland. The R626 is entirely in County Cork.

See also
Roads in Ireland

References
Roads Act 1993 (Classification of Regional Roads) Order 2006 – Department of Transport

Regional roads in the Republic of Ireland
Roads in County Cork